Little Ninja Brothers, known in Japan as , is a 1989 video game developed and published by Culture Brain for the Nintendo Entertainment System in 1989 in Japan, 1990 in the United States, and 1991 in Europe. It is the second game in the Super Chinese series.

Little Ninja Brothers is the first game in the Super Chinese series to feature role-playing video game elements, an addition to the series that would continue into the other games. The plot follows two young brothers, Jack and Ryu, attempting to find out the mysterious reason for the invasion of Chinaland.

It was the second game in the series, preceded by Kung-Fu Heroes, and followed up by a sequel Super Ninja Boy, released on the Super NES. There were also two Ninja Boy spin-off games released for the Game Boy in both regions. A manga adaptation of the game was serialized in early issues of video game magazine GamePro.

External links
RPGClassics Shrine

1989 video games
Action role-playing video games
Culture Brain games
Nintendo Entertainment System games
Video games about ninja
Super Chinese
Video games developed in Japan 
Virtual Console games for Wii U
Single-player video games